Luc Paul Maurice Besson (born 18 March 1959) is a French film director, screenwriter and producer. He directed or produced the films Subway (1985), The Big Blue (1988), and La Femme Nikita (1990). Associated with the Cinéma du look film movement, he has been nominated for a César Award for Best Director and Best Picture for his films Léon: The Professional (1994) and the English-language The Messenger: The Story of Joan of Arc (1999). He won Best Director and Best French Director for his sci-fi action film The Fifth Element (1997). He wrote and directed the 2014 sci-fi action film Lucy and the 2017 space opera film Valerian and the City of a Thousand Planets.

In 1980, near the beginning of his career, he founded his own production company, Les Films du Loup, later renamed Les Films du Dauphin. It was superseded in 2000 when he co-founded EuropaCorp with longtime collaborator . As writer, director, or producer, Besson has been involved in the creation of more than 50 films.

Early life
Besson was born in Paris, to parents who both worked as Club Med scuba-diving instructors. Influenced by this milieu, as a child, he planned to become a marine biologist. He spent much of his youth traveling with his parents to tourist resorts in Italy, Yugoslavia, and Greece. The family returned to France when he was 10. His parents divorced, and both remarried; of this, he said:

"Here there is two families, and I am the only bad souvenir of something that doesn't work," he said in the International Herald Tribune. "And if I disappear, then everything is perfect. The rage to exist comes from here. I have to do something! Otherwise I am going to die."

At age 17, Besson had a diving accident that left him unable to dive. In a 2000 interview with The Guardian, he described how this influenced his choice of career:

"I was 17 and I wondered what I was going to do. ... So I took a piece of paper and on the left I put everything I could do, or had skills for, and all the things I couldn't do. The first line was shorter and I could see that I loved writing, I loved images, I was taking a lot of pictures. So I thought maybe movies would be good. But I thought that to really know I should go to a set. And a friend of mine knew a guy whose brother was a third assistant on a short film. It's true. So, I said: 'OK, let's go on the set.' So I went on the set...The day after I went back to see my mum and told her that I was going to make films and stop school and 'bye. And I did it! Very soon after I made a short film and it was very, very bad. I wanted to prove that I could do something, so I made a short film. That was in fact my main concern, to be able to show that I could do one."

Career
Besson reportedly worked on the first drafts of Le Grand Bleu while still in his teens. Out of boredom, he started writing stories, including the background to what he later developed as The Fifth Element (1997), one of his most popular movies, inspired by the French comic books he read as a teenager. He directed and co-wrote the screenplay of this science fiction thriller with American screenwriter Robert Mark Kamen.

At 18, Besson returned to his birthplace of Paris, where he took odd jobs in film to get a feel for the industry. He worked as an assistant to directors including Claude Faraldo and Patrick Grandperret. He directed three short films, a commissioned documentary, and several commercials. He then moved to the United States for three years, but returned to Paris, where he formed his own production company. He first named it Les Films du Loup, then changed it to Les Films du Dauphin.

In the early 1980s, Besson met Éric Serra and asked him to compose the score for his first short film, L'Avant dernier. He subsequently had Serra compose for other films. Since the late 20th century, Besson has written and produced numerous action movies, including the Taxi series (1998–2007), the Transporter series (2002–2008; another collaboration with Robert Mark Kamen), and the Jet Li films Kiss of the Dragon and Unleashed. His English-language films Taken, Taken 2, and Taken 3, all co-written with Kamen and starring Liam Neeson, have been major successes, with Taken 2 becoming the largest-grossing export French film. Besson produced the promotional movie for the Paris 2012 Olympic bid.

Besson won the Lumières Award for Best Director and the César Award for Best Director, for his film The Fifth Element (1997). He was nominated for Best Director and Best Picture César Awards for his films Léon: The Professional (1994) and The Messenger: The Story of Joan of Arc (1999). French actor Jean Reno has appeared in several films by Besson, including Le dernier combat (1983), Subway (1985), The Big Blue (1988), La Femme Nikita (1990), and Léon: The Professional (1994).

Cinéma du look
Critics such as Raphaël Bassan and Guy Austin cite Besson as a pivotal figure in the Cinéma du look movement—a specific, highly visual style produced from the 1980s into the early 1990s. Subway (1985), The Big Blue (1988) and La Femme Nikita (1990) are all considered of this stylistic school. The term was coined by critic Raphaël Bassan in a 1989 essay in La Revue du Cinema n° 449. A partisan of the experimental cinema and friend of New Wave ("nouvelle vague") directors, Bassan grouped Besson with Jean-Jacques Beineix and Leos Carax as three directors who shared the style of "le look." These directors were later critically described as "favouring style over substance, and spectacle over narrative".

Besson, and most of the filmmakers so categorised, were uncomfortable with the label. He contrasted their work with France's New Wave. "Jean-Luc Godard and François Truffaut were rebelling against existing cultural values and used cinema as a means of expression simply because it was the most avant-garde medium at the time," said Besson in a 1985 interview in The New York Times. "Today, the revolution is occurring entirely within the industry and is led by people who want to change the look of movies by making them better, more convincing and pleasurable to watch.

"Because it's becoming increasingly difficult to break into this field, we have developed a psychological armor and are ready to do anything in order to work," he added. "I think our ardor alone is going to shake the pillars of the moviemaking establishment."

Besson directed a biopic of Aung San Suu Kyi called The Lady (2011) (original title Dans la Lumiere). He also worked on Lockout (2012).

Work
Many of Besson's films have achieved popular, if not critical, success. One such release was Le Grand Bleu. 
"When the film had its premiere on opening night at the 1988 Cannes Film Festival, it was mercilessly drubbed, but no matter; it was a smash," observed the International Herald Tribune in a 2007 profile of Besson. "Embraced by young people who kept returning to see it again, the movie sold 10 million tickets and quickly became what the French call a 'film générationnel,' a defining moment in the culture."

Besson created the Arthur series, which comprises Arthur and the Minimoys, Arthur and the Forbidden City, Arthur and the Vengeance of Maltazard and Arthur and the War of the Two Worlds. He directed Arthur and the Invisibles, an adaptation of the first two books of the collection. A film with live action and animation, it was released in the UK and the US.

Critical evaluation
Besson has been described as "the most Hollywood of French filmmakers." Scott Tobias wrote that his "slick, commercial" action movies were "so interchangeable—drugs, sleaze, chuckling supervillainy, and Hong Kong-style effects—that each new project probably starts with white-out on the title page."

American film critic Armond White has praised Besson, whom he ranks as one of the best film producers, for refining and revolutionizing action film. He wrote that Besson dramatizes the struggle of his characters "as a conscientious resistance to human degradation".

Personal life
Besson has been married four times; first, in 1986, to actress Anne Parillaud. They had a daughter, Juliette, born in 1987. Parillaud starred in Besson's La Femme Nikita (1990). They divorced in 1991.

Besson's second wife was actress and director Maïwenn Le Besco, whom he started dating when he was 31 and she was 15. They married in late 1992 when Le Besco, 16, was pregnant with their daughter Shanna, who was born on 3 January 1993. Le Besco later claimed that their relationship inspired Besson's film Léon (1994), where the plot involved the emotional relationship between an adult man and a 12-year-old girl. Their marriage ended in 1997, when Besson became involved with actress Milla Jovovich during the filming of The Fifth Element (1997).

They divorced in 1999.

On 28 August 2004, at age , Besson married film producer Virginie Silla. They have three children: Thalia, Sateen, and Mao Besson.

Sexual misconduct and rape allegations 
In 2018, actress Sand Van Roy, who appeared in Valerian and the City of a Thousand Planets, accused Besson of rape. Several other women, who wished to remain anonymous, described "inappropriate sexual behavior" by the director, but did not press charges.  The director's lawyer Thierry Marembert stated that Besson "categorically denies these fantasist accusations" and that the accuser was "someone he knows, towards whom he has never behaved inappropriately". Five women have made sex-offence allegations against Besson, including a former assistant, two students of Cité du Cinéma studio, and a former employee of Besson's EuropaCorp.

In February 2019, French prosecutors dropped the case against him, citing lack of evidence. In December 2021, a judge dismissed the case against Besson following a second investigation. The public prosecutor’s office in Paris stated that "the investigations clearly establish that the criminal facts of rape were not committed, that the absence of consent of the civil party is not established and the existence of a constraint, threat, violence, is not characterized". In April 2022, Van Roy submitted a complaint against the magistrate in charge of the case.

Selected filmography

Legacy and honours
Among Besson's awards are the Brussels International Festival of Fantasy Film Critics Prize, Fantasporto Audience Jury Award-Special Mention, Best Director, and Best Film, for Le Dernier Combat in 1983; the Italian National Syndicate of Film Journalists Silver Ribbon-Best Director-Foreign Film, for La Femme Nikita, 1990; the Alexander Korda Award for Best British Film, Nil by Mouth, 1997; and the Best Director Cesar Award, for The Fifth Element, 1997.

Besson was awarded the Inkpot Award in 2016.

Film company

In 2000, Besson superseded his production company by co-founding EuropaCorp with Pierre-Ange Le Pogam, with whom he had frequently worked since 1985. Le Pogam had then been Distribution Director with Gaumont. EuropaCorp has had strong growth based on several English-language films, with international distribution. It has production facilities in Paris, Normandy, and Hollywood, and is establishing distribution partnerships in Japan and China.

Music videos
 "Pull Marine": Isabelle Adjani (1983)
 "Mon légionnaire": Serge Gainsbourg (1988)
 "Que mon cœur lâche": Mylène Farmer (1992)
 "Love Profusion": Madonna (2003)
 "L'impasse": Kery James
 "I Feel Everything": Cara Delevingne (2017)

References

External links

 
 
 
 Luc Besson Interview, Angel-A
 JewReview.net video interview with Luc Besson and Rie Rasmussen about Angel-A
 In-depth interview with Luc Besson
 The films of Luc Besson, Hell Is for Hyphenates, 28 February 2014
 Les Films du Loup (France)—uniFrance Films
 Les Films du Dauphin – uniFrance Films

 

 
1959 births
Living people
20th-century French screenwriters
21st-century French screenwriters
Film directors from Paris
BAFTA winners (people)
Best Director César Award winners
Best Director Lumières Award winners
Science fiction film directors
French male screenwriters
French-language film directors
French music video directors
Inkpot Award winners